Michael West (born August 4, 1964) is a former backstroke swimmer from Canada, who competed for his native country at the 1984 Summer Olympics in Los Angeles, California.  There he won the silver medal in the men's 4x100-metre medley relay, and the bronze medal in the 100-metre backstroke.

See also
 List of Commonwealth Games medallists in swimming (men)
 List of Olympic medalists in swimming (men)

References

1964 births
Living people
Canadian male backstroke swimmers
Commonwealth Games gold medallists for Canada
Olympic bronze medalists in swimming
Olympic bronze medalists for Canada
Olympic silver medalists for Canada
Olympic swimmers of Canada
Swimmers at the 1982 Commonwealth Games
Swimmers at the 1983 Pan American Games
Swimmers at the 1984 Summer Olympics
Sportspeople from Kitchener, Ontario
Medalists at the 1984 Summer Olympics
Pan American Games silver medalists for Canada
Pan American Games bronze medalists for Canada
Commonwealth Games bronze medallists for Canada
Olympic silver medalists in swimming
Commonwealth Games medallists in swimming
Pan American Games medalists in swimming
Universiade medalists in swimming
Universiade gold medalists for Canada
Universiade bronze medalists for Canada
Medalists at the 1983 Summer Universiade
Medalists at the 1985 Summer Universiade
Medalists at the 1983 Pan American Games
Medallists at the 1982 Commonwealth Games